Wieckowski or Więckowski (feminine: Więckowska; plural: Więckowscy) is a Polish surname. Notable people with the surname include:

 Andrzej Więckowski (1945–2019), Polish-American scientist
 Bob Wieckowski (born 1955), American attorney and politician
 Ewa Więckowska (born 1958), Polish politician
 Irena Więckowska (born 1982), Polish sabre fencer
 Jan Więckowski (1923–2008), Polish military officer
 Marian Więckowski (1933–2020), Polish racing cyclist
 Mirosław Więckowski (born 1952), Polish luger

See also
 Josh Winckowski (born 1998), American baseball player
 
 

Polish-language surnames